Little Senegal is a 2001 Algerian film directed by Rachid Bouchareb. It was Algeria's submission to the 73rd Academy Awards for the Academy Award for Best Foreign Language Film, but was not accepted as a nominee.

Plot 
Alloune, a guide at the museum of slavery on the Gorée island decides to go to New York to look for his descendants who were deported there. His trip takes him from the Southern country's fields to Harlem in New York where he finds one person from his family.

Description 
The purpose of the movie is to explore the African roots of Black-American people who claim African origins but ignore their cultural past. The movie led to the attribution of the name Little Senegal to a district in New York populated with Senegalese people, located in Harlem on 116 West Street, between the 5th and the 8th Avenue.

Cast
Sotigui Kouyaté ... Alloune
Sharon Hope ... Ida
Roschdy Zem ... Karim
Karim Traoré ... Hassan (credited as Karim Koussein Traoré)
Adetoro Makinde ... Amaralis
Adja Diarra ... Biram
Malaaika Lacario ... Eileen
Toy Connor ... Girl on Bridge (supporting)

See also
List of submissions to the 73rd Academy Awards for Best Foreign Language Film

References

External links

2001 films
2001 drama films
Wolof-language films
2000s English-language films
English-language French films
English-language German films
2000s French-language films
2000s Arabic-language films
Films directed by Rachid Bouchareb
Films set in the United States
Algerian drama films
French drama films
German drama films
2001 multilingual films
Algerian multilingual films
French multilingual films
German multilingual films
2000s French films
2000s German films